Batman Forever is a 1995 film in the Batman film series.

Batman Forever may also refer to:

 Batman Forever (soundtrack)
 Batman Forever (score)
 Batman Forever (pinball)
 Batman Forever (video game)
 Batman Forever: The Arcade Game